Meckelia confluens is a species of Ulidiidae or picture-winged fly in the genus Meckelia of the family Tephritidae.

References

Ulidiidae